Clair Joseph "Mike" Purdy, Jr. (January 24, 1892 – January 10, 1950) was an American football player and coach. He played in the National Football League  with the Rochester Jeffersons, New York Brickley Giants, Syracuse Pros and the Milwaukee Badgers. Brickley's New York Giants are not related to the modern-day New York Giants. He also played in the Ohio League in 1919 for the Akron Pros and even recommended that Fritz Pollard join the team that season.

References

Additional sources
 
 

1892 births
1950 deaths
American football fullbacks
American football halfbacks
American football quarterbacks
Akron Indians (Ohio League) players
Brown Bears football players
Milwaukee Badgers players
New York Brickley Giants players
Rochester Jeffersons players
Syracuse Pros players
Sportspeople from Auburn, New York
Players of American football from New York (state)